HEA or Hea may refer to:

Hektoen enteric agar, used in microbiology to identify certain organisms
Higher Education Academy, in the United Kingdom
Higher Education Act of 1965, an Act of the Congress of the United States which was supposed to strengthen the resources of colleges and universities, and to provide financial aid to students
Higher Education Act 2004, an Act of the Parliament of the United Kingdom which introduced several changes to the higher education system
Higher Education Authority, in the Republic of Ireland
Hockey East Association, an NCAA hockey conference
High-entropy alloys, a new class of multi-component alloys in materials science
Hea (cicada), a genus of cicadas
Happily Ever After (HEA), fairy tale ending or when a couple's life appears perfect
Happily Ever After Agency, from Hoodwinked Too!
 HEA – European type of I-beam
 Herat International Airport, the IATA airport code HEA